Matt Walters is an Australian entrepreneur and musician based in country Victoria, Australia. Walters has toured with musician Tori Amos. His music found an audience online when he self released his debut album, Farewell Youth, in 2011.

Career

Matt Walters was originally signed to Mercury Records (Universal) whilst studying film at RMIT University in Melbourne in 2009. His debut album, Farewell Youth, was released in 2011.

In 2015, Walters launched Parlour, an online platform for artists to book in house shows with their biggest fans. The platform has been used by notable Australian and US artists and has facilitated over 2000 gigs worldwide. Parlour's technology concentrate(s) on using data that artists can gather from platforms such as Facebook, Spotify, and other similar platforms, to actually figure out where an artist can tour and where their fans actually exist.

Discography

Studio albums

EPs

References

External links
 Official website

1985 births
Australian singer-songwriters
Living people
21st-century Australian singers